Reg Fearman (born 26 April 1933 in London, England) is a former international speedway rider and promoter.

Riding career
He first received his speedway licence on his sixteenth birthday, presented to him in front of a forty thousand strong West Ham crowd at the West Ham Stadium in London. He was nicknamed "Fearless Fearman" for his daredevil style of riding.

He first rode at Rye House on 1 August 1948 (scoring eleven points) but was immediately banned by the Speedway Control Board (SCB) and the Auto Cycle Union (ACU) when it was discovered he was still only fifteen years of age.

A local lad from Plaistow,  Reg spent most of his career with the West Ham Hammers but did spend a couple of seasons with the Stoke Potters in the early '50s whilst on National Service. He made several appearances for the England national team.

He retired from racing at the end of 1961 although he had already begun promoting in 1960 with his club Stoke Potters in the newly formed Provincial League.

Promoting and management career
Reg promoted at several tracks from 1960 until his retirement in 1986, including Stoke, Liverpool, Wolverhampton, Middlesbrough, Newcastle, Long Eaton, Leicester and Halifax. He was chairman of the British Speedway Promoters' Association (BSPA) in 1973, 1974, 1975, 1976, 1979, 1983 and 1984. He had previously been the British League Division Two chairman from 1968 until 1972.

He also had spells as national team manager for England, when they won the World Team Cup and the World Pairs Championship.

References 

1933 births
People from Plaistow, Newham
Living people
British speedway riders
English motorcycle racers
Sportspeople from London
Speedway promoters
West Ham Hammers riders
Stoke Potters riders
Leicester Hunters riders
Yarmouth Bloaters riders